Joseph Kromelis (1947 – December 11, 2022) known as 'Walking Man', 'Walking Dude' or Walking Yanni was a Chicago-area homeless man and street vendor known for his physical appearance and for wandering about the city. He typically dressed in a v-neck t-shirt and a suit and kerchief, and had long, wavy hair and a thick mustache.

Sources differ as to whether Kromelis was born in Germany or Lithuania. His family lived in Lithuania, and while Kromelis was still a child, moved to Chicago where they managed a bar on Halsted street. After his family moved to Michigan, Kromelis remained in Chicago, found work in a factory and later obtained a peddler's license. and sold jewelry for income while wandering the Loop.

Over decades, he became a noted Chicago personality and was the subject of a documentary called "Dudementary". About his fame, Kromelis stated “I’m like the Kardashians — I’m famous for doing nothing.”

Victim of assaults
In 2016, another homeless man beat Kromelis with a baseball bat; after hospitalization his name and some details about his background became public.

On May 25, 2022, Kromelis was the victim of an unprovoked arson attack while he slept under a bridge. The attack left him with burns over 40-65% of his body.

Death
Kromelis died on December 11, 2022, at the age of 75, as a result of the injuries he sustained in the arson attack. After donations, his remains were interred in St. Boniface Cemetery.

References

1947 births
2022 deaths
People from Chicago